Action is the second album by the American garage rock band ? and the Mysterians, released in 1967.

The album's sleeve notes include facts about the band including their interests. Much of their interests are also the inspiration for many of their songs.

Track listing
All songs written and composed by Rudy Martinez except where noted.
"Girl (You Captivate Me)" (Alan Dischel, Joey Di Francesca) – 2:17 
"Can't Get Enough of You Baby" (Sandy Linzer, Denny Randell) – 1:57
"Got To" – 2:22
"I'll Be Back" – 2:02
"Shout (Parts 1 & 2)" (Rudolph Isley, Ronald Isley, O'Kelly Isley, Jr.) – 5:31
"Hangin' on a String" (Gloria Shayne, Jason Darrow) – 2:15
"Smokes" – 1:52
"It's Not Easy" – 2:43
"Don't Hold It Against Me" (Lor Crane, Bernard Ross) – 1:57
"Just Like a Rose" (Jay Darrow) – 2:10
"Do You Feel It" – 2:25

Personnel

? and the Mysterians
 Rudy Martinez – vocals
 Bobby Balderrama – lead guitar
 Frank Lugo – bass guitar
 Frank Rodriguez – organ
 Eddie Serrato – drums

Technical
 Neil Bogart – producer
 Bob Reno – producer (Tracks 1, 3)
 Douglas Fiske – art direction

Charts
Singles

References

1967 albums
? and the Mysterians albums
Albums produced by Neil Bogart
Cameo-Parkway Records albums